Edward McKenna (10 March 1950 – 19 January 2019) was a Scottish drummer who played with The Sensational Alex Harvey Band, Rory Gallagher, The Greg Lake Band, and The Michael Schenker Group. He also toured with Ian Gillan for a short period of time in 1990, alongside fellow former SAHB member, bassist Chris Glen. He lectured in Applied Arts at North Glasgow College from 1996–2011.

Biography
McKenna was born in Lennoxtown, Stirlingshire. He was educated at St Patrick's High School, Coatbridge. His studies included double bass lessons at school, several piano lessons, and a year under Glasgow big band veteran, Lester Penman. He was the drummer of The Sensational Alex Harvey Band from 1972 to 1978, and then worked with artists including Rory Gallagher, 1978–1981; Greg Lake & Gary Moore in The Greg Lake Band, 1981–83; the Michael Schenker Group (MSG), 1981–84; Bugatti & Musker, 1982; Ian Gillan; and worked on a solo album for Nazareth singer Dan McCafferty in 1975.

He had his own band after his time in MSG, called McKenna's Gold. Formed at the end of 1986, this band played together for just over two years and featured Charles Bowyer/vocals, Julian Hutson-Saxby/guitar, Alex Bowler/bass, and Steve Franklin/keyboards. Hutson-Saxby later played guitar with the reformed Sensational Alex Harvey Band after Zal Cleminson's departure in 2008.

In 1992, McKenna and Zal Cleminson formed The Party Boys, an idea McKenna had in Australia whilst working with Womack and Womack. They recruited keyboardist Ronnie Leahy from Stone The Crows, and invited well-known rock singers such as Stevie Doherty, Fish, and Dan McCafferty.  Soon after, the band reunited with SAHB keyboardist Hugh McKenna, Ted's cousin, and reformed SAHB.  This line-up included Stevie Doherty from Zero Zero and Peter Goes To Partick on vocals. They released the album Live In Glasgow '93. They disbanded in 1995 after a final gig with Maggie Bell at The Kings Theatre in Glasgow.

In 2004, McKenna reformed SAHB with remaining members Zal Cleminson, Hugh McKenna, and Chris Glen, but this time introduced vocalist Max Maxwell, formerly of The Shamen. Their farewell tour was so successful they continued to tour between 2004–2009, including The Wickerman Festival and The Sweden Rock Festival in 2006. The tours were: 2004 - Brick By Brick, 2005 - Zalvation, 2006 - Dogs of War, 2007 - Hail Vibrania.

In this time they released the live album Zalvation, which was the band's first official release since Rock Drill in 1977 with Alex Harvey.  They performed tours in the UK, Europe and Australia, as well as two sell-out Christmas shows in 2006 and 2007 at the ABC in their hometown of Glasgow.  In 2008, Cleminson left the band and retired from performing, and was replaced by guitarist Julian Hutson Saxby before disbanding permanently in 2008. 

Although primarily known as a rock musician, McKenna worked with jazz guitarist John Etheridge, Juno Award-winning American/Canadian blues guitarist Amos Garrett, American soul duo Womack & Womack, Paul Rose, Gwyn Ashton, The Rhumboogie Orchestra, Frank O'Hagan, and Fish. He toured with Rory Gallagher bassist Gerry McAvoy and Dutch guitar virtuoso Marcel Scherpenzeel in "Band of Friends", a celebration of the music of Rory Gallagher. This band won 'Best Blues Band of 2013' at the European Blues Awards, and released the CD/DVD Too Much Is Not Enough. He won the 'Best Musician (performance)' award at the European Blues Awards 2015. Band of Friends released the live album Live & Kickin''' and the studio album Repeat After Me.

McKenna and SAHB bass player Chris Glenn reunited with Michael Schenker for Michael Schenker Fest, an anniversary line-up of all three original MSG vocalists (Gary Barden, Graham Bonnet and Robin McAuley). In 2016, the band recorded a concert in Tokyo and released a live DVD and double CD package. In 2018, the studio album Resurrection'' was released.

Ted McKenna died on 19 January 2019, at the age of 68, of a hemorrhage during a routine operation for a hernia.

References

External links 
Band of Friends website

1950 births
2019 deaths
Scottish rock drummers
British male drummers
People from Coatbridge
Michael Schenker Group members
Scottish educators